Boomburb is a neologism principally promoted by American Robert E. Lang of the Metropolitan Institute at Virginia Tech for a large, rapidly growing city in the United States that remains essentially suburban in character, even as it reaches populations more typical of urban core cities. It describes a relatively recent phenomenon in a United States context.

Definition
Boomburbs are defined as incorporated places in the top 50 Metropolitan areas in the United States of more than 100,000 residents, but that are not the core cities in their metropolitan areas and have maintained double-digit rates of population growth (10% or more) over consecutive censuses between 1970
and 2000.

As of the 2000 Census, the United States contained 54 boomburbs, which accounted for about half of the 1990s growth in cities with between 100,000 and 500,000 residents.

List of boomburbs
Robert E. Lang of Metropolitan Institute at Virginia Tech lists 54 boomburbs as following:
^Not on Robert E. Lang's original list.

 Arizona
Chandler, Gilbert, Glendale, Mesa, Peoria, Scottsdale, Tempe
 California
Anaheim, Chula Vista, Corona, Costa Mesa, Daly City, Escondido, Fontana, Fremont, Fullerton, Irvine, Lancaster, Moreno Valley, Oceanside, Ontario, Orange, Oxnard, Palmdale, Rancho Cucamonga, Riverside, San Bernardino, Santa Ana, Santa Clarita, Santa Rosa, Simi Valley, Sunnyvale, Temecula^, Thousand Oaks
 Colorado
Aurora, Arvada^, Lakewood, Thornton^, Westminster
 Florida
Clearwater, Coral Springs, Davie^, Hialeah, Miramar^, Pembroke Pines, Pompano Beach^
Kansas
Olathe^, Overland Park^ 
Illinois
Aurora^, Elgin^, Joliet^, Naperville, Schaumburg^
 Michigan
Warren^, Sterling Heights^, Livonia^
 Nevada
Henderson, North Las Vegas
 Oregon
Hillsboro^, Gresham^
 Texas
Allen^, Arlington, Carrollton, Frisco^, Garland, Grand Prairie, Irving, McKinney^, Mesquite, Pasadena^, Pearland^, Plano, Richardson^, Round Rock^, Sugar Land^
 Utah
West Jordan^, West Valley City
 Washington
Bellevue, Everett^, Kent^, Renton^, Vancouver^
 Other States
Meridian, Idaho^; Cary, North Carolina^; Rio Rancho, New Mexico^; Chesapeake, Virginia

The boomburbs listed above are based on the populations of cities determined by and definitions of metropolitan areas used in the 2000 Census. Boomburbs have occurred mostly in the Southwest, with nearly half developing in areas of central and southern California.

See also
Edge city

Notes

References 
Lang, Robert E. and Jennifer B. LeFurgy (2007). Boomburbs:  The Rise of America's Accidental Cities.  Brookings Institution Press.
Lang, Robert and Patrick Simmons (2001). "Boomburbs: The Emergence of Large, Fast-Growing Suburban Cities in the United States." Fannie Mae Foundation, Census Note 06.
Lang, Robert (2003). "Are the Boomburbs Still Booming?" Fannie Mae Foundation, Census Note 15.
Knox, Paul and Linda McCarthy (2005). Urbanization: An Introduction to Urban Geography. Pearson/Prentice Hall. Second Edition. pp. 163, 164, 560.
Hayden, Dolores (2004). A Field Guide to Sprawl. W.W. Norton & Company. pp. 26–27, 118.

External links 
Metropolitan Institute at Virginia Tech
"Is Anaheim the New Brooklyn?" by Robert E. Lang and Jennifer LeFurgy, Planetizen

Urban studies and planning terminology
Human habitats
Suburbs